Douglas Matheus do Nascimento, commonly known as Douglas is a Brazilian footballer who plays as a centre-back for São Bernardo.

He has previously played in 2015 Campeonato Brasileiro Série C for Juventude and 2017 Campeonato Brasileiro Série D for São Bernardo.

References

External links
 

Living people
1995 births
Brazilian footballers
Association football defenders
Esporte Clube Juventude players
Veranópolis Esporte Clube Recreativo e Cultural players
Esporte Clube Pelotas players
Barra Futebol Clube players
São Bernardo Futebol Clube players
Red Bull Brasil players
Atlético Clube Goianiense players
Campeonato Brasileiro Série C players
Campeonato Brasileiro Série D players